North Pine Sports Club is an Australian football (soccer) club from Dakabin, a suburb of Moreton Bay, Queensland, Australia.  The club currently play in the Capital League 1 after relegation from Brisbane Premier League in 2016.

History
North Pine United Soccer Club was formed in 1974, originally playing its home games on the centre arena of the Lawnton Showgrounds.

The club commenced fielding teams competitively in 1977, by joining the Brisbane North Junior Soccer Association and fielding a senior team in Brisbane's Division Seven. It was at this time North Pine moved to its current headquarters at Bob Brock Park in Dakabin, with the original clubrooms being constructed in 1983.

From 1978 to 1993, the club played 16 seasons in Division Four and Five. Since winning promotion for a second time from Division Four in 1996, North Pine have remained within the top three divisions of Football Brisbane competition.

In 2002, the club assumed its present name, the North Pine Sports Club, reflecting the incorporation of the club's football and netball teams.

Successive promotions and premierships in 2006 and 2007 saw the club rise to the Brisbane Premier League for the first time in the club's history. Since 2008, North Pine has regularly moved between the Brisbane Premier League and Capital League 1, being relegated three times in its five Premier League seasons. The club's best season in the Brisbane Premier League was in 2011 when the club finished in sixth place and qualified for the finals series.

Recent Seasons

Source:

The tier is the level in the Australian soccer league system. Tiers were adjusted when the Qld State League commenced in 2008.

Honours

Brisbane Division 1 – Champions 1998; Premiers 1999
Brisbane Premier Division 2 – Premiers and Champions 2006
Brisbane Premier Division 1 – Premiers 2007 and 2010

References

External links
Official Website

Soccer clubs in Brisbane
Brisbane Premier League teams
Association football clubs established in 1974
1974 establishments in Australia